The Hymn of Leuthen is a 1933 German film depicting Frederick the Great, directed by Carl Froelich starring Otto Gebühr, Olga Tschechowa and Elga Brink. It was part of the cycle of nostalgic Prussian films popular during the Weimar and Nazi eras. The title refers to the 1757 Battle of Leuthen.

The film was loosely based on the novel Fridericus by Walter von Molo.  It presented Frederick as an inspired leader. It was shot at the Tempelhof Studios in Berlin. The film's sets were designed by the art director Franz Schroedter.

The film premiered four days after Adolf Hitler became chancellor of the Reich.

Cast

References

Bibliography 
 Klaus, Ulrich J. Deutsche Tonfilme: Jahrgang 1933. Klaus-Archiv, 1988.

External links

1933 films
1930s German-language films
1930s historical films
German historical films
Films of Nazi Germany
Films of the Weimar Republic
German war films
Films set in 1757
Films based on Austrian novels
Biographical films about German royalty
Cultural depictions of Frederick the Great
Prussian films
Seven Years' War films
Films directed by Carl Froelich
Films directed by Arzén von Cserépy
Films set in the Kingdom of Prussia
1930s German films
Films shot at Tempelhof Studios